WVW, wvw, wVw. WvW or variant may refer to:
 Wyoming Valley West School District
 West Virginia Wesleyan College
 WvW (world versus world), a game mode in Guild Wars 2